was an OVA produced by Gainax and was released on September 21, 1991. It is a story about a battlefield in the stock market.

External links 

1991 anime OVAs
Comedy anime and manga
Gainax